Thomas Marvin Calvin (June 13, 1926 – January 22, 2020) was an American football halfback in the National Football League (NFL). Calvin played college football for the University of Alabama. He was drafted by the Pittsburgh Steelers in the 25th round (298th overall) of the 1951 NFL Draft. He played for the Steelers for four seasons (1952–1955).

See also
 Alabama Crimson Tide football yearly statistical leaders

References

External links
 

1926 births
2020 deaths
American football halfbacks
Alabama Crimson Tide football players
Pittsburgh Steelers players
People from Athens, Alabama
Players of American football from Alabama